Manuela or Manuéla is a feminine Portuguese and Spanish given name. The name is a variant of the masculine "Manuel", which is in turn derived from the Hebrew name "Emanuel", meaning "God is with us".

List of people with the given name Manuela or Manuéla 
Manuela Arbelaez, model and actress appearing in The Price is Right models (formerly Barker's Beauties)
Manuela Azevedo, Portuguese singer
Manuela Berchtold, Australian freestyle skier
Manuela Campanelli, Italian science journalist
Manuela Dalla Valle, Italian swimmer
Manuela Derr, German sprinter
Manuela Di Centa, Italian cross-country skier
Manuela Groß, German figure skater
Manuela Ímaz, Mexican actress
Manuéla Kéclard-Mondésir (born 1971), French politician
Manuela Kormann, Swiss curler
Manuela Kraller, German singer
Manuela Leggeri, Italian volleyball player
Manuela Machado, Portuguese long-distance runner
Manuela Maleeva, Bulgarian / Swiss tennis player
Manuela Antonia Márquez García-Saavedra (1844-1890), Peruvian writer, poet, composer pianist
Manuela Martelli, Chilean film and television actress
Manuela Mölgg, Italian alpine skier
Manuela Mucke, German sprint canoer
Manuela Priemer, German hammer thrower
Manuela Sáenz, Ecuadorian national heroine 
Manuela Schmermund (born 1971), German Paralympic sport shooter
Manuela Schwesig, German politician
Manuela Spinelli, translator associated with Italian association football coach Giovanni Trapattoni
Manuela Stellmach, German freestyle swimmer
Manuela Velasco, Spanish film actress
Manuela Bosco, Finnish actress

Fictional characters
Manuela Santos, a fictional character in Degrassi: The Next Generation
 Manuela Casagranda, a famous songstress and physician in Fire Emblem: Three Houses
 Manuela, a character from the James Bond film Moonraker
 Manuela Hidalgo, a  character in Resident Evil.

References

Spanish feminine given names
Portuguese feminine given names